John Lydford (c.1337–1407) was an English priest and canon lawyer.

Lydford was Archdeacon of Totnes from 1385 until 1407.

References

1330s births
1407 deaths
Archdeacons of Totnes
14th-century English people
15th-century English people